Brookesia brygooi, commonly known as Brygoo's chameleon, Brygoo's pygmy chameleon, and the leaf chameleon, is a species of chameleon, a lizard in the family Chameleonidae. The species, which is endemic to Madagascar, was first described in 1995 by Raxworthy and Nussbaum and named in compliment to French herpetologist Édouard-Raoul Brygoo.

Conservation status
The International Union for Conservation of Nature classed B. brygooi as Least Concern.

Distribution and habitat
B. brygooi is endemic to southwestern Madagascar, where its type locality is Analavelona, Fianarantsoa Province, south-central Madagascar. Because it is widespread and commonly found in protected areas, it was listed as Least Concern by the International Union for Conservation of Nature. Details about the true population of B. brygooi are unknown, although it is known to be widespread. It is found in many protected parks/areas/nature reserves, and is also protected under the Madagascar laws.

Description
B. brygooi has an "unusual" shape of body and is earthy in colour.

Diet
The diet of B. brygooi includes insects.

Behavior
B. brygooi spends the night resting on twigs.

Reproduction
The female of B. brygooi lays two to five eggs per clutch. The eggs measure  each.

Taxonomy
This species was initially described by Raxworthy and Nussbaum in 1995 under the name of Brookesia brygooi. The same scientific name was later used by Nečas in 1999, and, most recently by Townsend et al. in 2009. According to the ITIS, the taxonomic status of B. brygooi is valid. It is commonly known as the leaf chameleon.

References

Further reading
Glaw F, Vences M (2006). A Field Guide to the Amphibians and Reptiles of Madagascar, Third Edition. Cologne, Germany: Vences & Glaw Verlag. 496 pp. .
Nečas Petr (1999). Chameleons: Nature's Hidden Jewels. Malabar, Florida: Krieger Publishing Co. 348 pp. .
Raxworthy CJ, Nussbaum RA (1995). "Systematics, speciation and biogeography of the dwarf chameleons (Brookesia; Reptilia, Squamata, Chamaeleontidae) of northern Madagascar". Journal of Zoology, London 235: 525-558. (Brookesia brygooi, new species, pp. 542–543).
Townsend TM, Vieites DR, Glaw F, Vences M (2009). "Testing Species-Level Diversification Hypotheses in Madagascar: The Case of Microendemic Brookesia Leaf Chameleons". Systematic Biology 58 (6): 641-656.

Reptiles described in 1995
Taxa named by Christopher John Raxworthy
Taxa named by Ronald Archie Nussbaum
Brookesia
Madagascar dry deciduous forests